Danial Sohrabi or Seyed Danial Sohrabi is an Iranian Greco-Roman wrestler.

in 2022, Sohrabi won the bronze medal in the 67 kg event at 2022 World Junior Wrestling Championships held in Sofia, Bulgaria.

Sohrabi won gold medal at 2022 U23 World Wrestling Championships in category 67 kg after being down 7 points and then coming back 17-7 in final match against Gagik Snjoyan.

References

External links 
 
 

Living people
Iranian male sport wrestlers
Sportspeople from Khuzestan province
20th-century Iranian people
21st-century Iranian people
Year of birth missing (living people)